A hunting blind (US), hide or machan is a concealment device or shelter for hunters or gamekeepers, designed to reduce the chance of detection by animals. There are different types of blinds for different situations, such as deer blinds and duck blinds. Some are exceedingly simple, while others are complex. The legality of various kinds of blinds may vary according to season, state and location.

Types of blinds
Blinds may be stable or mobile. An early blind used by hunters was a cocking-cloth, a piece of canvas stretched on a frame like a kite that would permit hunters to approach pheasants and to shoot them through a hole in the cloth.

Ground blinds are an alternative to the traditional tree stand; movements in a well-designed ground blind can virtually be undetectable by the game.

The hunter simply sits down on the top and pushes dirt away with both feet, front and back. In two to three minutes a shallow depression is created. Then additional stubble from cut grain can be placed around the edges, enough to provide cover when the hunter lies down when birds are spotted, sitting up when they come in range. The blind can be deepened to allow sitting upright, if desired, by using a digging tool. In other areas duck blinds can be quite elaborate. More substantial structures are common in the midwestern United States, and their purpose often extends beyond concealment to include protection from the elements, particularly from rain and cold. In some areas, blinds can approach small cabins in their size and amenities. A sinkbox is another elaborate form of duck blind, designed for partial submersion in a body of water; sinkboxes are illegal to use in the United States. Also for hunting waterfowl in fields, hunters will use a layout blind. A layout blind is a low profile blind that a person can lie down in and stubble in to hide from waterfowl.

Deer blinds may not be legal in all areas, so hunters are obligated to check hunting laws before constructing them. Alternatives include simply sitting still at the base of a tree. In some states, hunting from a camouflaged blind may be prohibited during rifle/shotgun season. In such cases, a hunter is required to add orange patch on blind such that the orange is visible from all angles.

Other simple blinds include climbing a tree, usually with special climbing equipment and with some kind of seat, or with a burlap enclosed frame. In India, a hunting platform on a tree during shikar is known as machan.

Notes

External links

Photographic project documenting original gamekeeper's blinds in Central Europe
 BLIND Advantage

Blind